Germany and ARD used a national selection to select the entry for the Eurovision Song Contest 1990, with the winner being chosen by televoting. Chris Kempers and Daniel Kovac were chosen as the winners with the song "Frei zu leben".

Before Eurovision

Ein Lied für Zagreb 
The final took place on 29 March 1990 at the German Theatre in Munich and was hosted by Hape Kerkeling. Ten acts presented their entries live and the winner was selected by public televoting.

At Eurovision
"Frei zu leben" was performed thirteenth on the night, following Switzerland and preceding France. At the close of voting, it had received 60 points, placing 9th of 22 countries competing.

Voting

References

External links
German National Final 1990

1990
Countries in the Eurovision Song Contest 1990
Eurovision